Thomas Evans (died 1633) was a British poet.

Life
Evans was educated at Corpus Christi College, Cambridge, where he graduated B.A. in 1612, M.A. in 1616, and B.D. in 1628. He was presented to the rectory of Little Holland, Essex, in 1618, and held that benefice till his death in 1633.

Works
Evans was the author of Oedipus, a rare poetical work. It is dedicated to John Clapham, one of the six clerks in chancery, and in a pedantic preliminary address, the author says that it is his "first child, but not the heyre of all the fathers wit: there is some laid up to enrich a second brother, to keepe it from accustomed dishonesty, when I shall put it to shift into the world; yet if this prove a griefe to the parent, I will instantly be divorc't from Thalia, and make myself happy in the progeny from a better stocke". Each canto contains about six hundred lines, rhyming alternately.

References

Attribution

Year of birth missing
1633 deaths
17th-century English poets
17th-century English male writers
17th-century English writers
Alumni of the University of Cambridge